Anthimus II was Ecumenical Patriarch of Constantinople for a few months in 1623.

Life
Anthimus was born in Constantinople to a noble and rich family. Before he was elected as Patriarch of Constantinople, he was Metropolitan of Adrianople.

His short reign has to be considered in the context of the clash between the pro-Calvinist Patriarch Cyril Lucaris, supported by the Dutch and English ambassadors, and his opponents supported by the French, Austrian and Venetian ambassadors to the Ottoman capital. The latter were successful at persuading the Grand Vizier to depose Cyril Lucaris on 12 April 1623 and to appoint in his place the blind and old Gregory IV. The Metropolitans and the bishops were unsatisfied with Gregory IV because he had not been canonically elected by the Holy Synod. Thus, on 18 June 1623, the Holy Synod deposed Gregory IV and formally elected Anthimus II as Patriarch of Constantinople.

Anthimus II, even if politically supported by the Catholic governments, remained a strong and good Orthodox. He sent metropolitans to Rhodes, where Lucaris was temporarily exiled, to persuade him to retire to Mount Athos, but without success. On the contrary, Lucaris, thanks to the Calvinist Dutch ambassador, returned to Constantinople and produced false instruments of credit for 20,000 Livres on the Patriarchate. Anthimus could not find such large amount and was forced to abdicate on 22 September 1623. Subsequently, Lucaris returned on the patriarchal throne for the third time.

After his resignation, Anthimus retired on Mount Athos where he died in 1628.

Notes

1628 deaths
17th-century Ecumenical Patriarchs of Constantinople
Year of birth unknown
Simony
Bishops of Adrianople
Clergy from Istanbul
Constantinopolitan Greeks